The Shanghai Metro (Shanghainese: Zaon6he5 Di6thiq7) is a rapid transit system in Shanghai, operating urban and suburban transit services to 14 of its 16 municipal districts and to Kunshan, Jiangsu Province. Served as a part of Shanghai rail transit, the Shanghai Metro system is the world's biggest metro system by route length, totaling . It is also the second biggest by the number of stations with 408 stations on 19 lines. It ranks first in the world by annual ridership with 3.88 billion rides delivered in 2019. The daily ridership record was set at 13.29 million on March 8, 2019. Over 10 million people use the system on an average workday.

History 

A subway was first proposed for Shanghai in 1956. Tests started in 1964, but construction was suspended during the Cultural Revolution in the mid-1960s. Opening in 1993 with full-scale construction extending back to 1986, the Shanghai Metro is the third-oldest rapid transit system in mainland China, after the Beijing Subway and the Tianjin Metro. From 2003 in most years new lines have come into operation. During the years leading up to the Expo 2010 (between the end of 2007 and 2010) the system length and number of stations saw the largest growth. It is still expanding quickly, with its most recent expansions having opened in December 2021. The following data displays the system length of Shanghai Metro and the number of stations.

1993–2002: Origins

The economic and population boom of Shanghai led to a surge in traffic that was beginning to overwhelm the transportation system by the end of the 1980s. The State Council of China approved the Master City Plan of Shanghai (1983–2000), the first-ever approval by the State Council in the history of Shanghai was approved in 1986. A 40-year phased program was designed that would include 11 metro lines covering over 325 km by 2025. On 14 August 1986, China's State Council approved the Proposal Concerning Construction of Shanghai City Subway Line from Xin Long Hua Station to Shanghai Railway Station.

The southern section of line 1 (four stations) opened on May 28, 1993. Full line (including middle and northern sections) eventually opened on April 10, 1995, and in the first year, it was handled an average of 600,000 passengers daily. The first phase of line 2 was inaugurated in June 2000, which is 2010 linked Hongqiao International Airport (SHA) and Pudong International Airport (PVG). The 25 km Pearl line (line 3) opened for revenue service in 2001. Line 5 opened in 2003. Line 4 joined the network in January 2006 and became a circular line in 2007.

The Master Plan of Shanghai Metro-Region 1999–2020 was approved by the State Council of China on May 11, 2001. The plan had 17 lines in total, containing four intra-city-region express rail lines, eight urban metro lines, and five urban light-rail lines with a total length of about 780 kilometers. The total length of the planned MRT network in the central city will add up to 488 kilometers. In addition, Shanghai will strengthen the development of the suburban rail transport network so that it can link to and coordinate with state rail lines, metro lines, and light railways. One or two rail transport lines are planned between every new city and the central city.

2003–2010: Rapid expansion for the Expo 2010
In 2003 when the length was only 3 lines, 65 kilometers (with a further 5 lines already under construction), Shanghai was named host city for the World Expo 2010, plans were made to extend the length of the Metro to 400 kilometers by the time it opened in 2010. Thereby it completed the initial 40-year plan 15 years ahead of schedule.
During Expo 2010 the metro system consisted of 11 lines, 407 km, and 277 stations.

2011–2021: Completion of a master plan
In 2009 Shanghai announced it would have 21 lines operating by 2020 with lines extending further into the suburban areas. At the end of 2021 (expected), most of the lines of the plan were opened (with an exemption of line 20, Jiamin line, and Chongming line) leading to 19 lines (line 1-18 and Pujiang), 802 km, 516 stations.

On 16 October 2013, with the extension of line 11 into Kunshan in Jiangsu province (about 6.5 km), Shanghai Metro became the first rapid transit system in China to provide cross-provincial service and the second intercity metro after the Guangfo Metro.

2021 onwards: Phase III construction
The National Development and Reform Commission has approved the 2018-2023 construction plan for the city's Metro network. The construction of five new metro lines (and two commuter rail lines) and two extensions to opened lines are expected to take five to six years and are planned to start construction before 2023. After completion, there will be 27 metro and commuter rail lines covering 1,154 kilometers.

With the Shanghai Master Plan, 2017-2035 more emphasis was put on other rail transit modes. The plan calls for a comprehensive transportation system that consists of multimodel rail transit. Intercity lines (intercity railway, municipality railway, and express railway), urban lines (subway and light rail), and local lines (modern tramcar, rubber-tired transit system) in a length of more than 1,000 km each.

By 2035, public transportation will account for over 50% of all means of transportation, and 60% of rail transit stations in the inner areas of the main city will have 600m of land coverage. According to the NDRC, the Shanghai Metro network (including commuter rail) will cover 1,642 kilometers in total by 2030 and more than 2,000 kilometers by 2035.

Ridership
Since 1993, the ridership of the entire network has grown as the new lines or sections come into operation. In 1995, the first year of operation, line 1 carried 62 million passengers (average daily passenger volume of 223,000). Ridership increased between 2011 and 2016 with 10% per annum, between 2017 and 2019 with 5%. The reduction in ridership in 2020 is due to Covid-19. Ridership recovered to close to pre-covid levels in 2021, with a ridership on 31 December of 13.014 million.

Lines

In service
There are currently 19 lines in operation, with lines and services denoted numerically as well as by characteristic colors, which are used as a visual aid for better distinction on station signage and on the exterior of trains, in the form of a colored block or belt.

Most tracks in the Shanghai Metro system are served by a single service; thus "Line X" usually refers to both the physical line and its service. The only exception is the segment shared by lines 3 and 4, between Hongqiao Road station and Baoshan Road station, where both services use the same tracks and platforms.

Future expansion
The Shanghai Metro system is one of the fastest-growing metro systems in the world. By then, every location in the central area of Shanghai will be within  of a subway station. In 2023 Shanghai Metro will connect with the metro system of Suzhou; the under construction Suzhou Metro line S1 will connect Shanghai Metro line 11 with Suzhou Metro line 3.

Infrastructure

Rolling stock

There are currently over 7,000 railcars in the Shanghai metro system. The train fleet reached 1,000 cars in 2007, 2,000 cars in 2012, and 3,000 cars in 2016, the 4,000th car was delivered on December 17, 2016, the 5,000th car was delivered on July 20, 2018. The 7,000th car was delivered on December 25, 2020.

Most lines currently use semi-automatic train operations (STO/GoA2). Starting and stopping are automated, but a driver operates the doors, drives the train if needed and handles emergencies. The exceptions being:
 Lines 5 and 17: Driverless train operations (DTO/GoA3) train attendant operates the doors and drives the train in case of emergencies.
 Lines 10, 14, 15, 18 and Pujiang line: Unattended train operations (UTO/GoA4) starting and stopping, operation of doors are all fully automated without any on-train staff. With a total length of 164 km it is the world's 2nd largest fully automated metro system, after the Singapore MRT.

Most lines currently use 6 car sets, with the exceptions being:
 The Minhang Developing Zone branch of line 5, line 6 and Pujiang line, which uses 4 car sets.
 Most trains on line 8 use 7 car sets.
 Lines 1, 2 and 14 use 8 car sets.

Pujiang line is the only line using cars with rubber tires running on concrete tracks.

All subway cars have air-conditioning. During summer of 2021 the subway's first and last carriages on Metro lines 3-5, 10-13, and 15-18 will be 2 degrees Celsius warmer than the other carriages, the air-conditioning is adjustable for different carriages on these lines. The measure aims to address the needs of some passengers who find the trains "too cold," especially the elderly and children.

Platform screen doors

Almost all stations have (full height) platform screen doors with sliding acrylic glass at the platform edge. Only half height doors called automatic platform gates are placed at most of the elevated sections and the section of line 2 from Songhong Road to Longyang Road. The train stops with its doors lined-up with the sliding doors on the platform edge and open when the train doors open, and are closed at other times.

During construction of the early lines conditions were reserved for the installation of platform screen doors but not installed, due to cost considerations and no domestic company made them. In the early 2000s, before the screen doors were installed, the annual suicide rate on the Shanghai subway system averaged about eight. In 2003 Shanghai Metro Operation Technology Development Co., Ltd. developed domestically platform screen doors with costs only 40% of imported platform screen doors (they cost over RMB6 million each to install). , opened 28 December 2004, was the first station to have installed platform screen doors. To help cope with passenger handling, platform safety doors were built for line 4 onwards and a program for retrofitting older lines was put in place. The retrofitting on existing lines started in November 2005 with line 1 (first station was ) whose core stations had doors by the end of 2006. Originally, platform screen doors were adopted to prevent cool or hot air from leaving the station to reduce electricity usage, not save lives.

Renewable energy
Shanghai metro started building solar plants from 2013 and the process has been accelerated since 2019, with plans to build rooftop solar plants with a total electricity generation capacity of 30 to 50 megawatts between 2021 and 2025. In 2021 it owned through it subsidiary Shanghai Metro New Energy Co., Ltd. ten rooftop solar plants on depots and parking lots (Chuanyanghe, Zhibei, Jinqiao, Longyang Road, Sanlin, Fujin Road, Zhongchun Road, Beizhai Road, Chentai Road and Pujiang Town) generating an average annual power generation of about 23 million kwh. Annual electricity consumption of Shanghai Metro exceeds 2.5 billion kWh.

Stations
There is cellular phone network coverage across the network. In 2020, all stations provided 5G network coverage. Free WiFi is also provided. There are toilets for passengers in more than 90% metro stations in Shanghai. The system is 100% wheelchair accessible, with elevators at all stations.

Safety
Riders are subject to searches of their persons and belongings at all stations by security inspectors using metal detectors, X-ray machines. Items banned from public transportation such as "guns, ammunition, knives, explosives, flammable and radioactive materials, and toxic chemicals" are subject to confiscation.

Stations are equipped with closed-circuit television. Police use it to  arrest pickpockets caught on CCTV, for example.

Smoking is strictly prohibited in the metro premises. Bicycles (including folding bikes) and pets (including cats, dogs etc.) are not allowed in stations. The use of skateboards, roller skates and other equipment is not allowed in stations and carriages.

Since April 1, 2020 there is a national ban on "Uncivilized Behavior" on China's Subways, which also includes conduct rules cracking down on bad subway etiquette, such as stepping on seats, lying down on a bench or floor and playing music or videos out loud. It also bans eating and drinking on subway cars nationwide, with exceptions for infants and people with certain medical conditions.

First AEDs (automatic external defibrillator) were installed at Metro stations in 2015, with all metro stations having AEDs at the end of 2021.

From February 14, 2022 the operations of line 11 in Kunshan have been suspended due to COVID-19 cases in Suzhou.

Passenger information systems
Plasma screens on the platforms show passengers when the next two trains are coming, along with advertisements and public service announcements. The subway cars contain LCD screens showing advertisements and on some lines, the next stop, while above-ground trains have LED screens showing the next stop. The LED screens are being phased in on line 1 and are also included in lines 7 and 9, two underground lines.

Station signs are in Simplified Chinese and English. There are recorded messages stating the next stop in Mandarin, English, and (on lines 16 and 17 only) Shanghainese, but the messages stating nearby attractions or shops for a given station (a form of paid advertising) are in Mandarin only. The metro operating company is resistant to expanding use of Shanghainese for announcing stops, on the basis that, on most lines, the majority of passengers can understand either Mandarin or English.

The Metro authority has tested a new systematic numbering system for stations on line 10, but did not extend it to other lines.

On December 31, 2009 Shanghai launched a website  displaying real-time comprehensive passenger flow information, each station and line is displayed as either green (normal operation), yellow (crowded), and red (suspended/not in operation).

Operations

Partial service patterns
Partial service patterns exist on all lines except line 16. Partial services serve only a (usually busier) sub-segment of the entire physical line.

Line 11, one of the three branch lines of the metro system, operates a different partial service pattern. Trains traveling to and from the branch line terminate at Huaqiao Station and Sanlin respectively. Hence, a passenger who wants to travel from the terminus of the branch to the eastern terminus of the line, at Disney Resort must change trains.

Express services
Line 16, unlike the rest of the system, is built with passing loops and operates express and rapid services. The service was postponed on January 30, 2014, due to lack of available trains, but resumed on March 21, 2016.

Operating hours and train intervals
The operating hours for most Shanghai metro stations starts between 5:00 to 6:00 in the morning and ends between 22:30 to 23:00 CST. The current timetable is available on the Shanghai metro website.

The interval of trains during peak hours differ between 1 minutes and 50 seconds on line 9 and 6 minutes on line 18. Lines in the inner sections have train intervals under three minutes during morning peak hours and under 3 minutes and 45 seconds during evening peak hour. The more suburban outer sections, outside peak hours train intervals are longer.

Extended hours on Friday and Saturday
On lines in the city center on Fridays and Saturdays, operating hours are extended by an additional hour.
From April 1, 2017, the operating hours of lines 1, 2, and 7-10 were extended by an hour after the regular last train on each Friday, Saturday and the last working days before Chinese Public Holidays. Since July 1, 2017 this was extended such that lines 1-4 and 5-13. By the end of 2018, all the stations in the city center extended their operating hours after midnight on Fridays and Saturdays.
Since September 30, 2020 extended operation was resumed on lines 1, 2, 9 and 10. Since April 30, 2021 also extended weekend operation of lines 7 and 13 was resumed.

Extra trains from Hongqiao Railway Station
On Sunday to Thursday, there are two trains on both line 2 and 10 taking passengers from Hongqiao Railway Station and airport after normal operation time and only stop at selected stations.

Owners and Operators

Fares and ticket system

Like many other metro systems in the world, Shanghai Metro uses a distance-based fare system. The system uses a "one-ticket network", which means that interchanging is possible between all interchange stations, given that the transfer staying within the Shanghai Metro system, without the purchase of another ticket where available, excluding some stations where transferring to another line at said station requires leaving the Fare Zone  which mandates a Single-Journey Ticket be used before entering that of another line, requiring the purchase of another Single-Journey Ticket (Shanghai Public Transport Cards are exempt as they are not consumed upon exit). The Shanghai Public Transport Card, which allows access to most public transport in Shanghai under one card, is another form of payment.

All stations are equipped with Shanghai public transport card self-service recharge machines, some of which support card sales and card refund operations. Passengers can also choose to purchase public transport cards to travel.
Automatic ticket vending machines are divided into "coins only" and "coins and banknotes are collected", the coin only machine collects 1 yuan and 0.5 yuan, and the coins and banknotes all accept 5, 10, 20, and 50 yuan banknotes and 1 and, 0.5 yuan coins. Vending machines will provide change.

Children under 1.3 meters
One or two children not taller than 1.3 meters (inclusive) are exempted from paying a fare in accompany of another passenger. In cases of more than two, the passenger should buy tickets. A preschool child, unattended by an adult, is not allowed to take the train alone.

Periodic pass
A pass for unlimited travel within the metro system for either 24 or 72 hours is offered. This pass is not available through vending machines, but has to be purchased at Service Centers at metro stations.

 A one-day pass priced at 18 yuan. This pass was introduced on 24 April 2010 for the Expo 2010 held in Shanghai.
 A three-day pass priced at 45 yuan. This pass was available since 8 March 2012.
 A Maglev single trip ticket and metro ticket priced at 55 yuan. This pass allows for a ride on the Shanghai Maglev Train and unlimited travel within the metro system for 24 hours. A Maglev round trip and metro ticket is priced at 85 yuan.

Distance-based fare
 
 The base fare is 3 yuan (RMB) for journeys under 6 km, then 1 yuan for each additional 10 km. As of December 2017, the highest fare is 15 yuan (travel between Oriental Land to Dishui Lake, the farthest distance at present). This fare scheme has not changed since 15 September 2005.

 Shortest route calculated as multiple route available between any entry-exit stations.
 Travel time limit is 4 hour. Additional lowest single journey fare (3 yuan) is required if time limit is exceeded.

Only passengers with unused tickets at the station on the day can refund tickets at the service center. Refunds can also be processed in the event of a train failure for more than 15 minutes, and the apology letter can be downloaded on the official website, WeChat public account and Metropolis app.

Single-Journey Ticket

Single-Journey tickets can be purchased from ticket vending machines, and at some stations, at a ticket window. Single-ride tickets are embedded with RFID contactless chips. When entering the system riders tap the ticket against a scanner above the turnstile, and when they exit they insert the ticket into a slot where it is stored and recycled. This ticket does not facilitate transfers at a virtual interchange station. Passengers would have to purchase a new ticket when reentering the fare gate.

Shanghai Public Transportation Card

In addition to a Single-Ride ticket, the fare can be paid using a Shanghai public transport card (SPTC or Jiaotong Yikatong), which is similar to the Octopus card of Hong Kong's MTR. This RFID-embedded card can be purchased at selected banks, convenience stores and metro stations with a 20-yuan deposit. This card can be loaded at ticket booths, Service Centers at the metro stations as well as many small convenience stores and banks throughout the city. The Shanghai Public Transportation Card can also be used to pay for other forms of transportation, such as taxi or bus. Refunds can be obtained at selected stations.

Discounts for SPTC holders:
 Cumulative discount: Users of the Shanghai public transport card get a 10% discount for the rest of the calendar month after paying 70 yuan in taking metro, The discount is applied only for journeys after the payment; it is not retroactively applied to previous journeys.
 Interchange discount: Transfers at virtual interchange stations the fare will be calculated continuously.
 Combined ride discount: Users of the Shanghai public transport card as part of the "Air-conditioned Bus Transfer Discount" get a 1 yuan discount when transferring to the metro within 120 minutes. (The 10% monthly discount may be applied after the transfer discount) This discount also applies for a bus to Metro and bus to bus transfers and can accumulate over multiple transfers. Depending on the time spent at the destination the discount will be applied at the start of the return trip as well, making the cost of a round-trip 11 yuan instead of the 16 yuan that would normally be charged without the card.

Public transport cards of other cities and provinces with Union Pay are accepted, but those do not offer discount and at virtual interchange stations transfers will be counted as a new ride.

Mobile payments
Passengers can also pay their Shanghai Metro fares using a mobile phone app, Daduhui (Metro Metropolis in English) since January 2018. The app requires one to scan a QR code when entering the fare gate at the origin station and again when exiting at the destination station. The fare is then deducted.

The system supports Alipay, WeChat Pay and Union Pay, three of the most commonly used mobile payment methods in China.

Fare evasion 
The official reported daily fare evasion rate accounts for about 0.16% of the total passenger flow. In the Shanghai Metro fare evasion will result in a fine of 6 times the fare.

Shanghai Metro have been cooperating with police to crack down on subway fare evasion. In 2012, the Shanghai Metro has reported 202,457 counts fare evasion, and an additional 472,898 yuan of adjusted fare was collected. Since June 3, 2013, the subway operator announced that all evaders will be recorded in the personal credit information system, which may lead to obstacles in loan applications and job hunting in the future. However, in actual implementation, the subway law enforcement officers only took the above measures for those who refused to make up the fare; and in some stations where fare evasion often occurred, the ticket gates were changed from the original three-bar type to gate type gates.

Controversies and incidents

Type C cars
In 1999, Shanghai Electric and Alstom Metropolis signed an agreement to invest 28 million US dollars to establish Shanghai Alstom Transportation Equipment Co., Ltd., and introduce a rail transit train production line in Minhang, which would be able to assemble 300 trains annually. Shanghai Alstom only had the national license to produce C-type cars from its establishment and no license to produce A-type cars. At that time, the municipal government stipulated that Shanghai would purchase 300 C-cars produced by the new company on lines 5, 6, and 8 of the future rail transit construction. The two parties reached an agreement on the purchase of 300 cars at that time. For this reason, the Transportation Research Institute had to "reduce" the predicted passenger flow to accommodate the C-type railcars, allowing for a reduction of the station's civil construction scope for the smaller trains. In the construction of lines 5, 6, and 8, the railcars were not supplied by the completion of the tender, but by a signed agreement for the railcars after "internal consultation and coordination" between Shentong Group and Shanghai Alstom, a violation of Articles 3 and 4 of the Law of the People's Republic of China on Tendering and Bidding.

The person in charge of the passenger flow forecasting project of line 8 confirmed that the passenger flow forecast report of line 8 was not completed until 2005 after continuous revision. However, in 2003 an agreement was signed for line 8 to supply 168 C-type vehicles, i.e., Shentong Group signed an agreement with Shanghai Alstom two years before the release of the forecast report, and decided to use the C-type car. At that time, it was predicted that the forecast passenger flow of line 8 would be about 500,000 passengers per day during the three years from 2007 to 2010. The operator used as initial forecast passenger flow of only 200,000 passengers per day. line 8 was extremely congested upon opening, even leading to physical conflicts between passengers. In 2010, to deal with the overcrowding Shanghai Metro hired passenger pushers to assist commuters boarding line 8 trains. Today, line 8 carries up to over 1 million passengers a day.

The estimated passenger flow of line 6 was more than 105,000. However, the highest passenger flow in the first few days of opening reached 150,000. With a headway of 13.5 minutes at opening and only four carriages, during peak hours people had to wait 45 minutes to get a ride. The relevant departments did not conduct a comprehensive survey of the residents around the proposed line to estimate passenger flow but instead household registration data was used which excludes migrant populations.

Other controversies
In June 2012 Shanghai Metro published a post on Weibo asking women to wear more clothing in public. The post argues it is not surprising for women to be harassed in the subway if they are wearing revealing clothing and called on women to cherish themselves. This post attracted backlash from women's rights advocates and feminists calling the post misogynistic.

Train accidents
 March 24, 2004 in the evening, at the turnaround line north of Tonghe Xincun station, during testing of the north extension of the line 1 (which opened on December 28, 2004), train No. 122 had a side collision with No. 102 train, resulting in train No.102 being damaged beyond repair. In 2007 the damaged section of the train was replaced with a new section. Details of the accident have not been released.
 December 22, 2009 at 5:58am, an electrical fault in the tunnel between South Shaanxi Road station and People's Square station caused a few trains to stall.The tripping failure of the power supply catenary was caused by the top of the tunnel felling off and causing a short circuit. As train No. 150 went to the Shanghai Railway Station's turnaround the signalling system sent a speed code of 65km/h instead of 20km/h, resulting in insufficient braking distance as the distance between train No. 150 and No. 117 was only 118 meters when the signal system sent a code of a speed of 0km/h. As train No. 150 increased speed from 60.5km/h to 62km/h, the train driver commenced emergency braking, preventing a collision with serious consequences. The train collided, at a speed of 17km/h, with the side of the rear of train No. 117 (without passengers) entering the turnaround track from the down platform in the reverse direction. Nobody was injured, but the front of the train No. 150 and the middle and rear of train No. 117 which was badly damaged. Service resumed at 11:48am. Some passengers on train No. 150 were in the train until 11am. The accidents affected millions of early commuters and occurred during Dongzhi Festival at which people will visit cemeteries to pay tribute to their departed ancestors. At 8.40pm another accident occurred and the  -  section was suspended again.
The Shanghai Metro claimed that the incident was caused by "signal debugging failure".
 September 27, 2011 at 2:51pm, two trains on line 10 collided between Yuyuan Garden station and Laoximen station, injuring 284–300 people.  Initial investigations found that train operators violated regulations while operating the trains manually after a loss of power on the line caused its signal system to fail. No deaths were reported.
 March 12, 2013 at 16:12, the second car of a line 5 train derailed near  station, there were no casualties. This caused the line 5 to run 48 minutes behind schedule. The subway said the accident was caused by "signal equipment failure."

Platform screen door accidents
 End of July 2006 at the Shanghai Stadium station on line 4 at about 7:50pm a middle-aged women accidentally caught her foot between the train and the platform as a group of passengers swarmed in when the beep sounded. She pulled out her foot, the shoe fell under the platform and she suffered skin trauma.

 July 15, 2007 at 3:34pm 47 year old Mr. Sun Mou entered a southbound line 1 train at Shanghai Indoor Stadium station and got caught between the screen door and the moving train. The train buzzer and screen door lights issued warning while the passenger still forcibly tried to get into the car, but was unable to squeeze into the compartment due to the crowding. Sun's mother sued Shanghai Metro for 1.18 million yuan. It was also found that the man carried 0.29 grams of heroin and the drug was detected in his blood. As platform screen door has repeatedly caught people, it was announced that safety switches will be installed on the inside of the screen door. If someone touches the safety switch, the train will be suspended. Moreover, a laser detection device is under development.

 July 24, 2007 at 2:41pm Mr. Lui entered a northbound line 1 train at Xujiahui station when the buzzer sounded. His laptop bag was caught between the train door and the screen door and hit the tunnel wall and fell when the train drove. As the laptop was worth 11,350 yuan and Shanghai Metro was only willing to compensate 2,500 yuan, Mr. Lui took it to court. It was ruled that both parties at fault, and a compensation of 6,000 yuan was set.

 On 5 July 2010 at the Zhongshan Park station a woman died after taken to hospital after trying to crowd into a subway train as the doors were closing.  With her wrist trapped in the train doors, she was dragged between the train and the platform screen doors when the train started moving, causing her to collide with the safety barrier and fall on the platform.

 On June 6, 2018 at People's Square station on line 8 at about 4pm a woman was trying to get on the train and other passengers had stepped back to wait for the next one. Her head became stuck between the platform screen doors and she was injured and required hospital care. The women unsuccessfully sued the metro operator for hospital expenses of 12,000 yuan, as she claimed not to have heard the door closing chime.

 On April 26, 2021 at Longyang Road station on line 2 a man committed suicide by climbing over the closed automatic platform gate and jumping on the tracks.

 On January 22, 2022 at 16.30 on line 15 Qi'an Road station an elderly woman died in hospital after she was trapped between the platform screen door and train.

Subway culture

Logo

The Shanghai Metro logo is a circular pattern composed of the first letters "S" and "M" of the English "Shanghai Metro", which means that the subway runs around the city and extends in all directions. The design reflects the rapid and convenient subway transportation and the speed of subway development. The logo is red, the font is black, and the background color is white:
 Red symbolizes the young, vigorous and prosperous Shanghai subway business;
 Black symbolizes the firm belief and pursuit of the subway enterprise to shoulder historical responsibilities and perseverance;
 White symbolizes the brilliant vision of the subway employees' wisdom, talent and fighting spirit.

Mascot
On 4 February 2010, in the run-up to the 2010 World Expo in Shanghai, the subway mascot named Changchang was unveiled. The mascot is a dynamic boy with red, white and blue as the main colors. Changchang means "happiness, smoothness, and imagination", which not only reflects the happiness that Shanghai subway brings to the city and life, but also reflects the dense network and unimpeded development of the subway throughout the city. It symbolizes its infinite possibilities to meet the diversified future.
Its helmet symbolizes technology and speed, and the subway logo on the helmet reflects the identity of the subway mascot;
The mask is based on the subway cab as the prototype, which represents the concept of operation, and also has the meaning of "leading";
The smiling eyes reflect the kindness and enthusiasm of Shanghai Metro, and it implies smiling service and warm transportation;
The "smooth" raised arms and the outstretched hands symbolize that the subway, as an important means of transportation in Shanghai, welcomes passengers at home and abroad with cordial service;
The feet represent the safety and comfort of the Shanghai subway;
The wheels on the feet symbolize technology and speed.

Museum
Shanghai Metro Museum
Shanghai Railway Museum
Shanghai Maglev Museum

Network Map

Notes

References

External links

 
Underground rapid transit in China
1993 establishments in China
Railway lines opened in 1993
1500 V DC railway electrification
Automated guideway transit